Cabrita is a surname. Notable people with the surname include:

Augusto Cabrita (1923–1993), Portuguese photographer, cinematographer and film director
Barbara Cabrita (born  1982), French-Portuguese actress
Eduardo Cabrita (born 1961), Portuguese politician
Fernando Cabrita (1923–2014), Portuguese football forward and manager
Pedro Cabrita Reis (born 1956), Portuguese artist

See also
The Battle of Cabrita Point, was a naval battle that took place while a combined Spanish-French force besieged Gibraltar on 10 March 1705 during the War of Spanish Succession

References